The John D. Chick Trophy is presented annually to the American Hockey League team that has the best record in the Pacific Division.

The award is named after John Chick, who served as vice president and treasurer of the American Hockey League.

Previously the trophy was awarded to the Western Division from 1962 to 1973, the Southern Division from 1974 to 1995, the Central and Empire Divisions from 1996 to 2003, the South Division in 2013, and the West Division in 2004–2012 and 2014–2015.

Winners

Winner by season
Key
‡ = Eventual Calder Cup champions

External links
Official AHL website
AHL Hall of Fame Trophies

American Hockey League trophies and awards